Statistics of Swedish football Division 3 for the 1939–40 season.

League standings

Uppsvenska Östra 1939–40

Uppsvenska Västra 1939–40

Östsvenska 1939–40

Centralserien Norra 1939–40

Centralserien Södra 1939–40

Nordvästra 1939–40

Mellansvenska 1939–40

Sydöstra 1939–40

Västsvenska Norra 1939–40

Västsvenska Södra 1939–40

Sydsvenska 1939–40

Footnotes

References 

Swedish Football Division 3 seasons
3
Sweden